The Canadian Sudanese College is an educational institution based in the city of Khartoum, Sudan.
It is affiliated with the American University in London.
The Chairman of the board is Dr. Al-Jazuli Daf'allah, a former prime minister of Sudan.
The college offers bachelor's and master's degrees in computer information systems and business administration.
The college is a member of the Sudanese University Libraries Consortium.

References

Universities and colleges in Sudan
Canada–Sudan relations